The flag of the Lithuanian SSR was first adopted by the Lithuanian SSR in 1918, which was a plain red flag. After Lithuanian SSR was established again in 1940, the flag was a red flag with the national name and a hammer and sickle in the upper canton. The flag in use from 1953 to 1988 was a red flag with the golden hammer and sickle and a gold-bordered red star in its upper canton with a white thin stripe and green thick band on the bottom.

History
During the Lithuanian–Soviet War, the first Lithuanian SSR used a plain red flag. This was later adopted by Lithuanian–Byelorussian SSR (Litbel).

When Lithuanian SSR was established again as a republic of the USSR, it adopted a new national flag on July 30, 1940. The flag was red with the Latin characters LIETUVOS TSR (Lithuanian SSR in the Lithuanian language) in gold sans-serif typeface in the upper canton, and a gold hammer and sickle below the text.

On July 15, 1953, a new flag was adopted. It was modified to meet the new requirements for all flags of the Soviet socialist republics. The top red portion took  of the width and incorporated the mandatory hammer and sickle and red star. The bottom part could be customized by each republic. Lithuania added a narrow white ( of the width) and a larger green ( of the width) strips. The green and white stripes thus represented the country's wide fields and forests, which serve the country's agricultural and forestry industries.

On November 18, 1988, the tricolor of Lithuania was adopted as the flag of the SSR, even before Lithuania declared independence in March 1990, being formally re-adopted on 20 March 1989. The Supreme Soviet of the Lithuanian SSR, inspired by pro-independence Sąjūdis, amended the constitution and adopted the tricolor flag of Lithuania that was used during the interwar years.

Legal status
Since Lithuania banned Soviet symbols in 2008, raising or otherwise using the Lithuanian SSR flag in public is illegal.

See also
 Emblem of the Lithuanian Soviet Socialist Republic
 Flag of Lithuania

References

Soviet Socialist Republic
Lithuanian Soviet Socialist Republic
Lithuanian Soviet Socialist Republic